William Quinn Hayes (born April 14, 1956) is a Senior United States district judge of the United States District Court for the Southern District of California.

Early life and education
Born in Bronxville, New York, Hayes received a Bachelor of Science degree from Syracuse University in 1978, a Juris Doctor from Syracuse University School of Law in 1983, and a Master of Business Administration from the Martin J. Whitman School of Management at Syracuse University in 1983.

Career
Hayes was in private practice from 1983 to 1986. He was an adjunct faculty member at National College from 1984 to 1985. He was adjunct faculty at the University of Colorado Denver from 1985 to 1986. He was Chief of the Criminal Division for the Southern District of California's United States Attorney's Office from 1987 to 2003. He served as adjunct faculty at Thomas Jefferson School of Law from 1989 to 1996. He was an adjunct faculty member at the University of San Diego School of Law in 1998.

Judicial service
Hayes is a United States District Judge of the United States District Court for the Southern District of California. Hayes was nominated by President George W. Bush on May 1, 2003, to a new seat created by 116 Stat. 1758. He was confirmed by the United States Senate on October 2, 2003, and received his commission on October 6, 2003. He assumed senior status on August 1, 2021.

References

External links

1956 births
Living people
Assistant United States Attorneys
Judges of the United States District Court for the Southern District of California
People from Bronxville, New York
Martin J. Whitman School of Management alumni
Thomas Jefferson School of Law people
Syracuse University College of Law alumni
United States district court judges appointed by George W. Bush
21st-century American judges
University of Colorado Denver faculty
University of San Diego faculty